Lollu Sabha Balaji (1971 – 7 March 2014) was an Indian actor comedian who appeared in many Tamil films and television serials. He has acted in a few films, most notably Silambattam and Dindigul Sarathy.

Balaji became popular with TV comedy shows like Super 10 and Lollu Sabha and moved on to become a comedy actor. He has also written dialogues for actor Shiva's 2013-release Thillu Mullu, a remake of the Rajinikanth-starrer of the same name. Balaji is known for his comic sense and was very popular in comedy shows that spoof Tamil films and make it a laugh riot. He was the one who introduced comedian Santhanam to the director of Lollu Sabha and both the actors shot to fame with the same show.

Partial filmography

Films

Television 

 Lollu Sabha

Death
He was living with his wife and three children. Balaji had a severe case of jaundice and died on 7 March 2014.

References

Tamil comedians
2014 deaths
1971 births
Date of birth missing
Place of birth missing
21st-century Indian male actors
Male actors in Tamil cinema
Male actors from Chennai